Blattella vaga, the field cockroach, is a species of cockroach in the family Ectobiidae. It is found in Europe and Northern Asia (excluding China), Central America, North America, and Southern Asia.

References

Further reading

 
 
 
 

Cockroaches
Articles created by Qbugbot
Insects described in 1935